Oh, Mayhem! is the ninth studio album by Dutch indie rock band Bettie Serveert, released on February 5, 2013 on Palomine Records.

Track listing
 "Shake-Her" – 2:25
 "Mayhem" – 4:05
 "Sad Dog" – 3:58
 "Had2Byou" – 2:21
 "Tuf Skin" – 2:40
 "Monogamous" – 2:23
 "Receiver" (alternative version) – 5:02
 "LoserTrack" – 4:07
 "iPromise – 3:53
 "D.I.Y." – 3:22

Personnel
Carol Van Dyk – vocals, guitar
Peter Visser – guitar
Herman Bunskoeke – bass guitar
Joppe Molenaar – drums

References

Bettie Serveert albums
2013 albums